is a town and the administrative centre of Hadsel Municipality in Nordland county, Norway. It is located on the northern coast of the island of Hadseløya and on the small, neighboring island of Børøya. In 2000, Stokmarknes received "town status".

Stokmarknes is the headquarters to the Hurtigruten coastal express company and also the Coastal Express Museum. The local hospital for the whole Vesterålen region (Nordland Hospital) is located in Stokmarknes. Stokmarknes is the home town of Norwegian band Madrugada.

The Børøy Bridge and Hadsel Bridge connect Stokmarknes to the island of Langøya to the north.  Stokmarknes Airport, Skagen is located on Langøya, just over the bridges from Stokmarknes.

Media gallery

See also
List of towns and cities in Norway

References

External links
 Stokmarknes secondary school
 Webcam from Stokmarknes

Populated places in Nordland
Cities and towns in Norway
Hadsel
Populated places of Arctic Norway